The Grasshopper Cup 2016 was the 2016 Grasshopper Cup, which is a tournament of the PSA World Tour event International (Prize money: 70 000 $). The event took place in Zurich in Switzerland from 13 to 17 April. Marwan El Shorbagy won his first Grasshopper Cup trophy, beating Grégory Gaultier in the final.

Prize money and ranking points
For 2016, the prize purse was $70,000. The prize money and points breakdown is as follows:

Seeds

Draw and results

See also
2016 PSA World Tour
Grasshopper Cup

References

External links
PSA Grasshopper Cup 2016 website
Grasshopper Cup 2016 official website

2016 in Swiss sport
2016 in squash
Squash tournaments in Switzerland
Sport in Zürich